Syed Manzar Imam  was a Pakistani politician who served as a member of the Provincial Assembly of Sindh. He was killed by target killers.

He graduated from the Karachi University.

He joined MQM in 1986.

He was elected to the Provincial Assembly of Sindh in 2008 election from PS-95.

See also
 Raza Haider

References

2013 deaths
Year of birth missing
Muttahida Qaumi Movement politicians
Targeted killings in Pakistan
Politicians from Karachi
People murdered in Karachi
Assassinated Pakistani politicians
Deaths by firearm in Sindh
University of Karachi alumni
Sindh MPAs 2008–2013